The Black Russian Terrier, also known as the Chornyi Terrier (chornyi being Russian for black) is a breed of dog created in USSR in Red Star (Krasnaya Zvezda) Kennel during the late 1940s and the early 1950s for use as military/working dogs. At the present time, the Black Russian Terrier is a breed recognized by the FCI (FCI's from September 1983), AKC (AKC's from July 2004), CKC, KC, ANKC, NZKC and other cynological organizations. The contemporary Black Russian Terrier is a working dog, guarding dog, sporting and companion dog.

Despite its name, the Black Russian Terrier is not a true terrier: it is believed that about seventeen breeds were used in its development, including the Airedale, the Giant Schnauzer, the Rottweiler, the Newfoundland, the Caucasian Shepherd Dog and other breeds.

History

The Black Russian Terrier was developed in the former USSR in Red Star (Krasnaya Zvezda) Kennel by the state for use as a military/working dogs. The breeding stock was largely imported from countries where the Red Army was active during the Second World War, especially East Germany. Breeds used in the development include the Giant Schnauzer, Airedale Terrier, Rottweiler, Newfoundland, Caucasian Shepherd Dog and other breeds. The Black Russian Terrier was bred for working ability, rather than appearance, and early examples only resembled today's Black Russian Terrier in their build and coat type. They were bred solely by the state owned Red Star Kennel in Moscow until 1957, when some puppies were sold to civilian breeders. These breeders began to breed for looks (as the original was rather plain) while retaining working ability. In time, the breed spread to the other parts of USSR like Saint Petersburg, Siberia, Ukraine and later to the first European country Finland and next to the other European countries: Hungary, Czechoslovakia, Poland, Germany and finally to the United States, Canada, Australia and others.

In 1955 the first working examples of the breed were put on show at an exhibition in Moscow and the first Breed Standard was published in 1958, which was then adopted by the Fédération Cynologique Internationale in 1984. In 1996 The Russian Federation Working Dog-breeders & Russian Kynological Federation (RKF) adopted a second Standard for the breed more in line to the modern day Russian Black Terrier. And it was also in 1996 that the breed was first introduced into the UK. In 1998 The Kennel Club added the Russian Black Terrier to the Import Register.

Description

Coat
The coat is a double coat with a coarse outer guard hair over a softer undercoat. The coat is hard and dense, never soft, woolly, silky or frizzy. It should be trimmed to between 5 and 15 cm (2–6 inches) in length. It should form a beard and eyebrows on the face, and a slight mane around the withers and neck that is more pronounced in males. The coat is low-shedding and the colour is black or black with some scattered gray hairs.

Size
According to the FCI standard the male stands 72 to 76 cm and not more than 78 cm at the withers compared to the female's 68–72 cm and not more than 74 cm. The male weighs between 50 and 60 kg (110-132 lbs), and the females weigh between 45 and 50 kg (99-110 lbs). Nowadays, even larger individuals are tolerated if the dog is well proportioned and retains correct movements. Dogs exhibited by the kennel club are slightly taller by about half an inch. 

At maturity (over 18 months of age), the AKC standard recommends 27-30 inches for males with the desired height between 27 and 29 inches and 26 and 29 inches for females with the desired height between 26 and 28 inches. A mature male less than 27 inches or more than 30 inches at the withers is considered a serious fault. A mature female less than 26 inches or more than 29 inches at the withers is considered a serious fault. Although the standard also states "Height consideration should not outweigh that of type, proportion, movement and other functional attributes." In proportions, a Black Russian Terrier should be slightly longer than tall, a ratio of 9 ½ to 10 being ideal.

Temperament
Befitting a dog bred for utilitarian purposes, Black Russian Terriers are highly obedient and have remarkable stamina and endurance. Not inclined to blindly befriend strangers, they form a deep rapport with their owners and are extremely biddable. Their intelligence enables them to excel at obedience training and adapt to various activities, from protection training to agility. They are also fearless and confident when dealing with an opponent and make world class guard dogs. For such a large breed, they are very light on their feet and have very quick reflexes. Hallmarking their ancestry as a military breed, the black Russian terrier is not lazy and craves a good challenge; On top of their higher than average need for physical activity, their intelligence means they crave mental enrichment and structure on top of physical activity.

Care
The Black Russian Terrier, because of its breeding as a working dog, has a very strong "work ethic", and needs a job to do in order to be happy. Early training is a must and they are very responsive to firm, consistent training, excelling at obedience competitions. They also perform well in other dog sports, such as agility, and Schutzhund training. They have a low-shedding coat, and need grooming several times a week. Dogs who compete in conformation need to be groomed a minimum of every three weeks to keep the coat in show condition. This breed forms a strong bond with a single person and will not thrive if sent to boarding facilities. The young Black Russian Terrier needs much exercise, and may become hyperactive and destructive if not provided an outlet for its energy. Once the dog has reached maturity their energy level decreases dramatically and they are most content laying near their owner.

Health
The Black Russian Terrier is a generally healthy and somewhat long-lived dog (lifespan of 9–14 years), however it is prone to certain hereditary diseases:

Major concerns:

 Hip dysplasia
 Elbow dysplasia
 Hyperuricosuria
 Juvenile laryngeal paralysis and polyneuropathy

Minor concerns

 Hypertrophic osteodystrophy (HOD): a nutritionally based developmental disease especially in young, heavy, fast-growing puppies
 Panosteitis (pano or wandering lameness): a nutritionally based developmental disease especially in young, heavy, fast-growing puppies
 Heart disease: the most common heart problems are aortic stenosis, mitral valve dysplasia, cardiomyopathy
 Eyes disease: the most common eyes problems are ectropion, entropion, conjunctivitis
 Allergies are a common ailment in dogs, and the Black Russian Terrier is no exception. There are three main types of allergies: food allergies, contact allergies and inhalant allergies

Other problems

 Hot spot
 Fungal infection—especially in ears and beard area

This is why it is extremely important to screen any potential breeders as well as their breeding stock. A well intended breeder will have all health checks on all breeding stock before making the decision to breed their dogs. While health checks on breeding stock can not guarantee a puppy will not develop any health issues later on, it is important to "do your homework" on any potential breeder.

See also
 Dogs portal
 List of dog breeds

References

External links

 

 Black Russian Terrier Breed Database

FCI breeds
Terriers
Dog breeds originating in Russia
Dog breeds originating in the Soviet Union